Simon Navagattegama [also spelled Nawagattegama]  (September 15, 1940 – October 9, 2005) was a Sinhala novelist, Sinhala Radio Play writer, playwright and actor. 

He is well known for his novel Sansararanye Dhadayakkaraya (Hunter in the wilderness of the Sansara) for its magical realism which is influenced by Buddhist mythologies, Mahayana Buddhist concepts and Freudian and Jungian psychoanalysis.

Literary style

K. K. Saman Kumara, a literary critic and writer in Sri Lanka, calls Simon as the predecessor of magical realism in Sri Lanka and calls his literary style as a Buddhist Borgesian one. Saman Kumara terms the Simon’s Literature as the ‘Buddhist Wisdom Literature’, taking it as a separate genre, which is unique to Sri Lanka. He compares Simon’s Literary endeavor to the philosophical attempts of Erick Fromm, who tried to merge  Buddhism, Marxism, and Freudian psychoanalysis. Malinda Seneviratne, who translated the Simon’s novel Sansararanyaye Dadayakkaraya (Hunter in the wilderness of the Sansara) into English, says that it "was an important literary landmark and Simon is one of the best writers in Sinhala in the second half of the last century." Deepthi  Kumara Gunarathna, has identified ‘Hunter in the wilderness of the Sansara’ as a novel which shows a postmodernism unique to Sri Lanka.  

K. K. Saman Kumara recognizes Simon Navagaththegama as one of authors, which he call as the ‘Modernist Trinity’ in Sinhala Literature, Tennyson Perera and Ajith Thilakasena among others.

Books
Ohuge Kathawa
Saagara Jalaya Madi Handuwa Obasanda (Short Story collection)
Saahithyaya, Samajawadaya saha kala vicharaya
Suddhilage Kathawa
Sansaranyaye Dadayakkaraya [Hunter in the Wilderness of Sansara]
Sansaranyaye Urumakkaraya 
Sansaranyaya Asabada
Dadayakkarayage Kathawa
Saankawa
Sapeshani
Ksheera Sagaraya Kalabina
Himalaya tharanaya kala Arjuna kumarayage Kathava
Wanaraya
Acharya Bryan De Cretser, Ohy saha ohuge adahas
Kalawa, Samajawadaya saha Kala Vicharaya

Film scripts 
 Suddilage Kathaawa
 Siri Medura
 Sagara Jalaya Madi Haduwa Obasanda
 Seilama
 Shieera Sagaraya Kelabina (production of the movie delayed due to the cost involved)

Radio play
Wanaraya

Stage drama
Gangawak, Sapathukabalak saha Maranayak
Puslodan
Suba saha Yasa
Sthrii (woman)
Sudu saha Kalu
Pandukhabaya

References

External links
 Simon Nawagaththegama on Sinhala Cinema Database
 Daily News
 Sunday Observer

1940 births
2005 deaths
Sri Lankan dramatists and playwrights
Sri Lankan novelists
Sri Lankan radio writers
Sri Lankan screenwriters
Alumni of the University of Peradeniya
20th-century novelists
20th-century dramatists and playwrights
Kala Keerthi
20th-century screenwriters